Iglunga Island is an uninhabited island in the Qikiqtaaluk Region of Nunavut, Canada. It is located in Baffin Island's Cumberland Sound, between Kangilo Fiord and Kangerk Fiord. Anarnittuq Island, Clear Passage Island, Imigen Island, Ivisa Island, the Kekertelung Islands, Nunatak Island, and Saunik Island are in the vicinity.

References

Islands of Baffin Island
Islands of Cumberland Sound
Uninhabited islands of Qikiqtaaluk Region